Drymonia obliterata, the indistinct marbled brown, is a moth of the  family Notodontidae. It is found in Central and Southern Europe, Asia Minor and Armenia.

The wingspan is 30–40 mm. The moth flies from May to July and in warmer regions also from August to September.

The larvae feed on Quercus, Fagus and Betula species.

Subspecies
There are two recognised subspecies:
Drymonia obliterata obliterata
Drymonia obliterata esmera

External links

Moths and Butterflies of Europe and North Africa
BioLib
Lepidoptera of Belgium 
Lepiforum.de

Notodontidae
Moths of Europe
Moths of Asia
Moths described in 1785
Taxa named by Eugenius Johann Christoph Esper